U.S. Highway 412 (US 412) runs east-to-west through northern Arkansas for about . The route begins at the Oklahoma state line near Siloam Springs, and ends at the Missouri state line east of Paragould.

Route description

Oklahoma to Alpena 
US 412 continues from Oklahoma, and heads directly towards the east. The route travels through the town of Siloam Springs, intersecting AR 16 and AR 59 along the way. The route continues to head east into the Northwest Arkansas metropolitan area, mainly traveling through the city of Springdale. The route intersects I-49, and US 71B, sharing a short concurrency with it. Afterwards, the route travels into the Boston Mountains, intersecting the communities of Hindsville and Huntsville along the way. The route continues through the mountains and is very rural, intersecting almost no other communities and only a couple of signed highways along the way, before reaching US 62 in Alpena. This would be the western end of the concurrency with US 62.

US 62/63 concurrency 

During this time, the routes intersect several communities and many highways along the way, traveling through the cities of Harrison, Yellville, Mountain Home, and Cherokee Village. US 412 also shares a concurrency with US 63 beginning in Hardy, and ending just east of Portia. US 62 is still concurrent with both routes during this time, however, the east end of the US 62 concurrency ends at Imboden, about  before the east end of the US 63 concurrency. US 412 splits apart from US 63 just east of Portia, and continues to head east towards Walnut Ridge.

Portia to Missouri 

US 412 continues directly east, intersecting the communities of Walnut Ridge and Paragould, and several highways along the way, including US 67/Future I-57 in Walnut Ridge, and US 49 in Paragould. The route continues into the Missouri Bootheel just east of Paragould.

History 

US Route 412 was initially built in 1987, as a route that spanned from Jackson, Tennessee, to Walnut Ridge, Arkansas. In 1988, US 412 was extended all the way to Oklahoma, following numerous other highways that have previously been built.

Arkansas Highway 68 

US 412 between the Oklahoma state line and Alpena was formerly known as Arkansas Highway 68 until 1988 when US 412 was extended to Oklahoma. The route began at OK 33 at the Oklahoma state line near Siloam Springs (now US 412), and ended at US 62 in Alpena.

Future
In Springdale, a bypass will be constructed to serve as a bypass for US 412. A portion between I-49 and AR 112 opened April 30, 2018, and is currently designated as AR 612.

On May 20, 2021, Senator Jim Inhofe of Oklahoma introduced legislation to designate the portion of US-412 between I-35 in Noble County, Oklahoma, and I-49 in Springdale as a future Interstate. The bill, titled the "Future Interstate in Oklahoma and Arkansas Act", was cosponsored by senators John Boozman and Tom Cotton, both from Arkansas. The senators' stated reasons for seeking an Interstate designation along US-412 included encouraging economic development, expanding opportunities for employment in the region, making travel safer and shipping easier, attracting new businesses, and better connecting rural and urban communities. Other supporters of the measure include the mayor of Tulsa, G. T. Bynum, and the heads of both ArDOT and the Oklahoma Department of Transportation (ODOT). In the Infrastructure Investment and Jobs Act, part of the route is designated as a future interstate. The bill says “the route that generally follows United States Route 412 from its intersection with Interstate Route 35 in Noble County, Oklahoma, passing through Tulsa, Oklahoma, to its intersection with Interstate Route 49 in Springdale, Arkansas.”

Major intersections

References

External links 

U.S. Route 412
12-4
Transportation in Benton County, Arkansas
Transportation in Washington County, Arkansas
Transportation in Madison County, Arkansas
Transportation in Carroll County, Arkansas
Transportation in Boone County, Arkansas
Transportation in Marion County, Arkansas
Transportation in Baxter County, Arkansas
Transportation in Fulton County, Arkansas
Transportation in Sharp County, Arkansas
Transportation in Lawrence County, Arkansas
Transportation in Randolph County, Arkansas
Transportation in Greene County, Arkansas